Zucchini is a type of squash.

It may also refer to:

Art, entertainment, and media
Zucchini (novel), 1982 children's novel
The Great Zucchini (born 1970), American children's entertainer
The Zucchini Warriors, a young adult novel by Gordon Korman

Food
Stuffed zucchinis, a recipe
Zucchini flower, an edible flower used in recipes

People 
 Luigi Zucchini (1915-1986), Italian ice hockey player
 Mario Zucchini (1910-1997), Italian ice hockey player

Other uses
Palazzo Zucchini Solimei, Bologna, Renaissance architecture palace, near the Palazzo Aldrovandi
Zucchini yellow mosaic virus, an aphid-borne potyvirus 
Zucc

See also
Zucco (disambiguation)
Zuccone (disambiguation)
Zucconi (disambiguation)
Zuke (disambiguation)